FEUP Fado Group is a Portuguese student group that performs Fado

FEUP Fado Group started in 1988, from a group of students in FEUP, Engineering Faculty of Porto University (Faculdade de Engenharia da Universidade do Porto). Since then it has played Fado de Coimbra using voice, classic guitar and Portuguese guitar. Since its beginnings it has had several members that have come and gone, maintaining the group alive during the years.

Style 
FEUP Fado Group plays Fado de Coimbra a variation of Fado, a traditional Portuguese gender. It's normally sung by students and features three components, voice, classic guitar and Portuguese guitar.

History

Discography

 Cantares D'Alma Lusa (1998)
Dança Palaciana
À Meia-Noite ao Luar
Meu Menino, Meu Anjo
Canção das Lágrimas
Traz Outro Amigo Também
Balada da Despedida do 5o Ano Jurídico 88/89
Variações em Ré menor no1
Branca Luz de Luar
Fado Para um Amor Ausente
Fado da Despedida
Crucificado
Estudo em Lá Maior
Cantar de Emigração
Fado Hilário
As Nossas Capas
 20 anos (2008)
Canção Verdes Anos
À Meia-Noite ao Luar
É Preciso Acreditar
Os Vampiros
O Meu Menino
Variações em Lá Menor (Artur Paredes)
Samaritana
Canção Pagã
Canto do Amanhecer
Balada da Despedida do 5o Ano Jurídico 88/89
Canção da Despedida (As Nossas Capas)
Balada da Despedida de Engenharia
Trova de Amor Lusíada (participação conjunta dos grupos musicais da FEUP)

Members
Since 1988 of history FEUP Fado Group has had several generations of musicians, which represent FEUP, Engineering Facultiy of Porto University. The most recent formation is as follows:

 Diogo Sousa — portuguese guitar
 Tiago Domingues — portuguese guitar
 Vasco Patarata — classic guitar
 Bruno Rafael — classic guitar
 Daniel Correia —  voice
 Filipe Vieira — portuguese guitar
 Carlos Costa —  voice
 Leonardo Moura —  voice
 João Silva — classic guitar
 Tiago Vicente — classic guitar
 Pedro Diaz-Argüelles —  voice
 Tiago Pires — portuguese guitar

And lined up in the past with:

Miguel Godinho, voice; Francisco Boia, portuguese guitar; Fábio Moreira, classic guitar; José Fonseca, voice; Pedro Neto, classic guitar; Miguel Pereira, portuguese guitar; Tiago Botelho, voice; Ricardo Cleto, classic guitar; António Pinto, voice; João Bonita Loureiro, classic guitar; António Lisboa, voice; Manuel Soares, portuguese guitar; Adalberto Ribeiro, classic guitar; Gomes da Costa, voice; João Miguel, classic guitar; José Carvalho, classic guitar; Jorge Pacheco, portuguese guitar; José Liberal, portuguese guitar; Mário Henriques, portuguese guitar; Mário Rui, voice; Mário Vieira, voice; Miguel Assis, classic guitar; Miguel Silva, portuguese guitar; Nuno Oliveira, voice; Paulo Nunes, voice; Paulo Renato, voice; Pedro Columbano, voice; Pedro Correia, voice; Pedro Pimentel, portuguese guitar; Quim Passarinho, voice; Ricardo Ferreira, voice; Tiago Azevedo, voice;Vileda, classic guitar; Vítor Santos, voice.

References

External links 
 FEUP Fado Group Website

Fado